Brian Jack Hartline (born November 22, 1986) is a former American football wide receiver who currently serves as the offensive coordinator at Ohio State. He played college football at Ohio State, and was drafted by the Miami Dolphins in the fourth round of the 2009 NFL Draft. He was also a member of the Cleveland Browns.

Early years 
Hartline attended GlenOak High School, where he both played football and ran track for four years. He began his football career as a quarterback, but in the fourth game of his sophomore year, he switched positions to wide receiver.

Hartline was also on the GlenOak track team, and he was the 2005 state champion in the 110 metres hurdles and the 300 metres hurdles.

College career 
Hartline redshirted his freshman year, but played in all 13 contests in 2006. In 2007, Hartline played an integral part in getting the Buckeyes to the 2008 BCS National Championship Game, averaging 13.3 yards per reception with 52 catches for 694 yards. In 2008, his final season, Hartline averaged 22.8 yards per reception with 21 catches for 479 yards.

He graduated from Ohio State in June 2009 with a degree in communication, but elected to forgo his final season of eligibility to enter the 2009 NFL Draft.

Professional career

Miami Dolphins 

Hartline was drafted by the Miami Dolphins in the fourth round (108th overall) of the 2009 NFL Draft. On October 4, 2009, Hartline caught his first career touchdown on a 2-yard pass from Chad Henne. Hartline finished his rookie season with 31 receptions and 506 receiving yards with three touchdown receptions plus a rushing touchdown on a 16-yard play against the Pittsburgh Steelers. Although he finished third on the team in receiving yards, Hartline led the team in receiving touchdowns.

After a solid rookie season in which played in every game, in the 2010 season, Hartline played only 12 games, although despite this, he had a better season statistically, with 43 receptions for 615 yards and 1 touchdown. He also rushed for 27 yards on 2 carries.

After the release of Ted Ginn Jr. in the 2011 off season, Hartline cemented his place as a starter, starting in every game of the season. He recorded statistics of 549 yards from 35 receptions, thrown by Chad Henne at the start of the season, but after the former Michigan QB's injury, backup Matt Moore took over, leading to Henne's release in 2012.

Despite struggling with injuries and illnesses during the off-season and training camp, Hartline played in the 2012 season opener against the Houston Texans and became the team's number one receiver with Brandon Marshall's trade. In a Week 4 loss against the Arizona Cardinals, he broke the Dolphins franchise record for receiving yards in a game with 253. He called the record
"bittersweet" because his team lost the game. After that week 4 performance, Hartline led the NFL in receiving yards. Hartline eclipsed 1,000 receiving yards, becoming the eighth receiver in Dolphins franchise history to accomplish the milestone.

During the offseason in 2013, Hartline stayed with the Dolphins, signing a 5-year, $31 million contract, with $12.5 million guaranteed.

Hartline suffered a torn PCL in the last regular season game against the New York Jets in 2013, which forced him to end his season. He led the team in receptions with 76, which is also a career-high, and finished his second consecutive year with over 1,000 receiving yards.

Cleveland Browns 
Hartline signed with the Cleveland Browns on March 9, 2015. On May 23, 2016, Hartline was released by the Browns.

NFL career statistics

Coaching career
Hartline joined Ohio State's football team as a graduate assistant in 2017. Already on the coaching staff as a graduate assistant, Hartline was named interim WR coach for Ohio State for the 2018 season after the firing of Zach Smith. The position was made permanent in December 2018. In 2020, Hartline was named to the AFCA "35 Under 35" Leadership Institute which annually recognizes the future leaders in the football coaching profession.
In 2020, Hartline was named "National Recruiter of the Year" by 247Sports. On January 9, 2021, Hartline was promoted to passing game coordinator, on top of his title as wide receivers coach.  In 2023, he was promoted to offensive coordinator at Ohio State.

Personal life 
Hartline's younger brother, Mike Hartline, is a former quarterback for the Indianapolis Colts and New England Patriots, and is currently the passing game coordinator and wide receivers coach for the Charlotte 49ers of the American Athletic Conference.

Hartline owns and operates two convenience stores with a partner in Columbus that he works at during the off-season.

References

External links

 Ohio State profile
 Miami Dolphins profile  
 Cleveland Browns profile 
 

1986 births
Living people
American football wide receivers
Cleveland Browns players
Miami Dolphins players
Ohio State Buckeyes football coaches
Ohio State Buckeyes football players
Coaches of American football from Ohio
Players of American football from Canton, Ohio